Mr Stringfellow Says No is a 1934 British thriller film directed by Randall Faye and starring Neil Hamilton, Claude Dampier and Muriel Aked. It was also released as Accidental Spy.

Plot
An innocent bystander, who is given a vital secret which he doesn't hear, is hounded by all countries until the Prime Minister bluffs them by pretending that he knows the secret too.

Cast
 Neil Hamilton as Jeremy Stringfellow
 Claude Dampier as Mr Piper
 Muriel Aked as Mrs Piper
 Kathleen Gibson as Miss Piper
 Marcelle Rogez as Marta
 Franklin Dyall as Count Hokana
 Peter Gawthorne as Prime Minister

References

External links
 

1934 films
1930s thriller films
Films directed by Randall Faye
British black-and-white films
British thriller films
1930s English-language films
1930s British films